Donnis Hanson Churchwell (May 11, 1936 – January 22, 2010), nicknamed "Bull", was an American football offensive tackle in the National Football League for the Washington Redskins.  He also played for the Oakland Raiders of the American Football League.  He played college football at the University of Mississippi for the Ole Miss Rebels and was drafted in the fifth round of the 1959 NFL Draft by the Baltimore Colts.

Churchwell died on January 22, 2010, at Greene County Hospital in his hometown of Leakesville.

References

1936 births
2010 deaths
People from Leakesville, Mississippi
Players of American football from Mississippi
American football tackles
Ole Miss Rebels football players
Washington Redskins players
Oakland Raiders players
American Football League players